The 2022 Forward Madison FC season is the fourth season in the soccer team's history, where they compete in USL League One of the third division of American soccer.

Club

Roster

Out on loan

Coaching staff

Front office staff

Transfers

Transfers in

Transfers out

Kits
 Shirt sponsor: Dairyland Insurance
 Sleeve sponsor: Just Coffee Cooperative
 Shirt manufacturer: Hummel

Exhibitions

Competitions

Overview

USL League One

Standings

Results summary

Results by round

Matches

U.S. Open Cup

As a member of USL League One, Forward Madison FC entered the 2022 U.S. Open Cup in the second round.

Statistics

Appearances and goals

Goalscorers

Assist scorers

Clean sheets

Disciplinary record

Honors and awards

USL League One Yearly Awards

All-League Team

USL League One Weekly Awards

Player of the Week

Save of the Week

Team of the Week

References

Forward Madison FC seasons
American soccer clubs 2022 season
2022 USL League One season
2022 in sports in Wisconsin